Florent Héau (born 1968) is a French classical clarinetist.

Biography 
Héau studied clarinet at the Conservatoire de Paris in Michel Arrignon's class. He obtained a First Prize before continuing his training in the advanced cycle.

In 1991 he won the first Grand Prix of the International Music Competition of Toulon. His duo with the pianist Patrick Zygmanowski won the first prizes at the Paris International Chamber Music Competitions (1994).

Héau performs in numerous French festivals (Pablo Casals Festival in Prades, La Folle Journée of Nantes, the Festival de Pâques de Deauville...) and in different countries (Belgium, China, Japan, Latvia, Poland, Spain, Kosovo, Hong Kong, South Korea, Taiwan, Georgia...). In 2009, Héau was asked to give works by Ibarrondo, Bacri and Beffa in world creation.

In 2011, he premiered Philippe Hersant's Concerto pour clarinette.

Héau is also one of the founding members of the musical theatre company "Les Bons Becs", in which he plays the clarinet, but also the sound blade and the tap dance. Since 1996, the show Tempête sur les anches, musical and poetic joke for clarinets and percussion, has been performed in France but also in many countries (Spain, Sweden, Italy, Denmark, Portugal, Germany, Belgium). In 2007, "Les Bons Becs" created a new show: Les Bons Becs en voyage de notes (directed by Caroline Loeb). It was played in France, but also in Spain and South Korea.

Héau was assistant professor of Michel Arrignon at the Conservatoire de Paris from 1999 to 2003, and is currently professor of clarinet at the Conservatoire à Rayonnement Régional de Paris and at the Haute Ecole de Musique de Lausanne. He is regularly invited to Europe and Asia to give master classes.

Discography 
 2010: Carlos Guastavino's Melodias argentinas with Marcela Roggeri
 2009: Mozart's Clarinet Concerto K622 - Sinfonia Concertante for Four Winds K297b with the Pražský komorní orchestr, with Nora Cismondi (oboe), Gilbert Audin (bassoon) and Mischa Cliquennois (French horn), live recording (Transart Live).
 2008: Mozart's Clarinet Quintet K581 - with the Manfred Quartet
 2007: Brahms' Sonatas for clarinet and piano
 2006: Robert Schumann's Pieces for viola, piano and clarinet
 2005: Beethoven's Trios for piano, clarinet and cello
 2004: Thierry Escaich's Chorus : Scènes de Bal - Nocturne - Jeux de doubles - La Ronde - Nocturne with Claire-Marie Le Guay
 2004: Nicolas Bacri's Pieces for clarinet with the European Camerata ensemble
 2003: Johannes Brahms and Max Reger's Sonatas for clarinet and piano - Sonatas for clarinet and piano, Op. 49 N°1 and N°2 - Sonatas for clarinet and piano, Op. 120 N°1 and N°2
 2002: Stravinsky's L'Histoire du soldat and Bartók's Contrasts - Sonatas for violin and piano
 2000: Musique française'' for clarinet and piano

References

External links 
 Official website
 The Bons Becs official website
 Florent Héau, Clarinette
 Discography (Discogs)
 Masterclass de Florent Héau - 3 pièces de Stravinsky - Pièce n°1 (YouTube)

1968 births
Living people
French classical clarinetists
Conservatoire de Paris alumni
21st-century clarinetists